Prema Racing (also competing as Prema Powerteam until 2022 and as Prema Orlen Team in the FIA World Endurance Championship) is a motorsport team from Italy. It operates in the FIA Formula 2 Championship and FIA Formula 3 Championship as well as various junior championships. In 2022 the team made its FIA World Endurance Championship and European Le Mans Series entries, beginning the efforts in the endurance racing. The team was founded in 1983 and is located in Grisignano di Zocco, in the Veneto region. Prema has been a talent pool for several Formula 1 junior programs, from Toyota and Renault in the early days to Alpine, Ferrari, McLaren, Mercedes, Red Bull, and Williams in recent years. For 2023, the team will enter nine championships, fielding a total of 28 drivers.

History

Prema Racing started operating in 1983 and joined the Italian Formula 3 Championship the following year. National F3 would be the main proving ground for the team in the early years. Among his first famous alumni stand future Touring Car star Fabrizio Giovanardi, multiple Le Mans winner Dindo Capello and Formula 1 World Champion Jacques Villeneuve. More Italian Formula 3 Championship titles came in 1990 with Roberto Colciago, in 1998 with Donny Crevels and in 1999 with Peter Sundberg. The team also made a one-season attempt at the International Formula 3000 Championship.   

In 1988, the team made its first international foray at the Macau Grand Prix, a competition that would have seen it at the start for the most part of the following decades. 

In 2000, Prema started competing in the modern-era Formula Renault races, winning the Formula Renault 2000 Eurocup Team Championship and the Italian Formula Renault 2000 championship with Ryan Briscoe in 2001. Other notable achievements include winning the 2005 Italian Formula Renault 2000 Championship with future F1 star Kamui Kobayashi. 

In 2003, the team entered the Formula 3 Euro Series and won the inaugural edition with Ryan Briscoe. In the following years, the team struggled to achieve competitive results but rebounded by claiming the 2011 and 2012 titles with Roberto Mehri and Daniel Juncadella. The series then transitioned into the FIA Formula 3 European Championship, and Prema started almost complete domination, winning all the team titles from 2011 and 2018 and all the driver championships but one. Some of the Champions also went on to become Formula 1 drivers including Esteban Ocon, Lance Stroll, and Mick Schumacher. In 2011, the team claimed its first Macau Grand Prix win with Juncadella.

In the same period, the team started expanding towards the bottom and the top of the junior single-seater ladder. Between 2006 and 2009, the team took part in the World Series Formula V8 3.5 championship with a best placing of fourth in 2008 with Miguel Molina, and also competed in the short-lived Italian and European Formula Abarth championships. 

With the FIA establishing a more strictly-regulated ladder toward Formula 1, Prema progressively expanded to encompass all its steps. While staying active in European Formula 3, the team embraced Formula 4, winning the first two editions of the Italian Formula 4 Championship with Lance Stroll and Ralf Aron. It also entered the GP2 Series in 2016, finishing 1-2 at debut with Red Bull Junior driver Pierre Gasly and Antonio Giovinazzi. In 2017, as the series evolved into the FIA Formula 2 Championship, Prema dominated again with Ferrari Driver Academy's Charles Leclerc claiming seven wins and seven poles en-route to an early title.  

For 2018 FIA Formula 2 Championship campaign the team fielded experienced drivers Sean Gelael and Nyck de Vries. In the 2018 FIA Formula 3 European Championship the team were represented by Ferrari Driver Academy members Marcus Armstrong, Robert Shwartzman and Guanyu Zhou. Their 2016 F3 driver Ralf Aron returned to the F3 team, as well as Mick Schumacher who went on to win the Formula. For their double ADAC and Italian F4 programme they signed Olli Caldwell and Ferrari Academy drivers Enzo Fittipaldi and Gianluca Petecof. Red Bull Junior Jack Doohan is scheduled to race with Prema for selected round in both championships.

In  the team is represented in FIA Formula 2 by Sean Gelael and their FIA F3 European Champion Mick Schumacher. Whilst the team only finished 9th in the team championship in F2, they were the champions in the inaugural F3 Championship with the drivers Robert Shwartzman, Jehan Daruvala and Marcus Armstrong. Shwartzman would also end up winning the driver's title, with Armstrong and Daruvala coming second and third respectively.
Prema also competed in Italian F4 in 2019, where they came second in both championships, being beaten comprehensively by Van Amersfoort Racing and the Norwegian driver Dennis Hauger.

Mick Schumacher was retained and Shwartzman was promoted for the following F2 season. Schumacher would go on to win the drivers title, with Shwartzman finishing in 4th with the most wins. 
In the 2020 F3 season, the driver line up was Logan Sargeant, Prema's 2019 FREC winner Frederik Vesti, and Oscar Piastri. Piastri would win the drivers' championship, with Sargeant and Vesti 3rd and 4th respectively.
For the 2020 FREC season, Prema's line up consisted of four full time drivers; past Prema F4 drivers Oliver Rasmussen and Gianluca Petecof, as well as Arthur Leclerc and Jamie Chadwick. The season was completely dominated by the team, with Petecof, Leclerc and Rasmussen finishing in the first three positions of the drivers' championship, and as in 2020 F3 season winning the teams' championship by a more than comfortable margin.

Current series results

FIA Formula 2 Championship

In detail
(key) (Races in bold indicate pole position) (Races in italics indicate fastest lap)

* Season still in progress

FIA Formula 3 Championship

In detail
(key) (Races in bold indicate pole position) (Races in italics indicate fastest lap)

* Season still in progress

Formula Regional European Championship

In detail 
(key) (Races in bold indicate pole position) (Races in italics indicate fastest lap)

* Season still in progress.

F3 Asian Championship/Formula Regional Asian Championship

Formula Regional Middle East Championship

Italian F4 Championship

Formula 4 UAE Championship

† Antonelli competed under the Prema Racing banner in Round 1 and under the Abu Dhabi Racing by Prema banner in Round 3.

24 Hours of Le Mans

FIA World Endurance Championship 

* Season still in progress

European Le Mans Series 

* Season still in progress

Former series results

International Formula 3000

Eurocup Formula Renault

Formula 3 Euro Series

Eurocup Formula Renault 2.0

Formula Renault 3.5 Series

Formula Renault 2.0 Alps

Italian Formula Three Championship

GP2 Series

In detail 
(key) (Races in bold indicate pole position) (Races in italics indicate fastest lap)

FIA European Formula 3 Championship

ADAC Formula 4

Timeline

Notes

References

External links
 
 

Italian auto racing teams
World Series Formula V8 3.5 teams
Formula Renault Eurocup teams
Formula 3 Euro Series teams
FIA Formula 3 European Championship teams
Italian Formula 3 teams
French Formula 3 teams
German Formula 3 teams
British Formula Three teams
GP2 Series teams
FIA Formula 2 Championship teams
FIA Formula 3 Championship teams
24 Hours of Le Mans teams
FIA World Endurance Championship teams
European Le Mans Series teams
International Formula 3000 teams
Auto racing teams established in 1984
1984 establishments in Italy
Formula Regional European Championship teams